The 2012 Kilkenny Senior Hurling Championship was the 118th staging of the Kilkenny Senior Hurling Championship since its establishment in by the Kilkenny County Board in 1887. The championship began on 13 October 2014 and ended on 11 November 2012.

James Stephens were the defending champions, however, they were defeated in the semi-final. Dunnamaggin were relegated from the championship. Ballyhale Shamrocks won the championship following a 0-16 to 0-12 defeat of Dicksboro in the final.

Team changes

To Championship

Promoted from the Kilkenny Intermediate Hurling Championship
 Danesfort

From Championship

Relegated to the Kilkenny Intermediate Hurling Championship
 Clara

Results

First round

Relegation play-off

Quarter-finals

Semi-finals

Final

Championship statistics

Top scorers

Top scorers overall

Top scorers in a single game

External links

 2012 Kilkenny Senior Hurling Championship results

References

Kilkenny Senior Hurling Championship
Kilkenny Senior Hurling Championship